The 1921 Copa Ibarguren was the 9th. edition of this National cup of Argentina. It was played by the champions of both leagues, Primera División and Liga Rosarina de Football crowned during 1921.

Huracán (Primera División champion) faced Newell's Old Boys (Liga Rosarina champion) in a match held in Boca Juniors Stadium on January 29, 1922. Newell's won 3–0 winning its first and only Ibarguren trophy.

Qualified teams 

Note

Match details

References

i
i
1921 in Argentine football
1921 in South American football